The 1918 New South Wales Rugby Football League premiership was the eleventh season of Sydney’s professional rugby league club competition, Australia’s first. Eight teams from across the city contested during the season, with South Sydney finishing on top of the ladder to claim the premiership.

Season summary
The quality of the competition in 1918 suffered due to the loss of players fighting in World War I. South Sydney and Western Suburbs dominated the season, dropping just two and three games respectively. With just three rounds to go, both sides met each square on 18 points each. A win for South Sydney would virtually guarantee them the premiership unless they dropped their final two games. At the end of the day, South Sydney prevailed 11–3 and went on to win all their remaining matches, taking away their fourth premiership from eleven seasons.

The season also saw the struggling Dales fail to win a game from fourteen starts. It was the first winless season in NSWRFL history and signalled the end for the club, who would play only a further two seasons in the premiership.

The Western Suburbs club claimed their first title by winning the knockout competition, the City Cup.

Teams
The lineup of teams remained unchanged from the previous season.

 Annandale
 Balmain, formed on 23 January 1908 at Balmain Town Hall
 Eastern Suburbs, formed on 24 January 1908 at Paddington Town Hall
 Glebe, formed on 9 January 1908
 Newtown, formed on 14 January 1908
 North Sydney, formed on 7 February 1908
 South Sydney, formed on 17 January 1908 at Redfern Town Hall
 Western Suburbs, formed on 4 February 1908

Ladder

References

External links
 Rugby League Tables - Notes AFL Tables
 Rugby League Tables - Season 1918 AFL Tables
 Premiership History and Statistics RL1908
Results: 1911-20 at rabbitohs.com.au

New South Wales Rugby League premiership
NSWRFL Season